HMS Merlin was an 8-gun yacht of the Royal Navy, best known for its use as a pretext for the 1672 to 1674 Third Anglo-Dutch War. 

In August 1671, Lord Arlington ordered Merlin, carrying the English ambassador's wife Dorothy Osborne, to pass Dutch ships anchored near Brill; as agreed by treaty, the Dutch struck their flag in salute but failed to fire white smoke, a courtesy given to warships. Dutch commander Van Ghent later explained he was doubtful as to whether the Merlin came into that category and did not want to create a precedent.

Sir George Downing, English ambassador in The Hague, was ordered to demand those responsible for this 'insult' be severely punished, which the States General of the Netherlands refused. Intended to raise public support for the war, it was so obviously manufactured that it had the opposite effect.   

Between 1681 and 1693, Merlin was employed by Captain Greenville Collins to complete a comprehensive survey of the British coastline, published in 1693 as Great Britain's Coasting Pilot; this makes it the first British warship dedicated to marine survey work, rather than exploration. 

Merlin was later used by Captain Greenville Collins to produce a complete survey of the coastline of the British coast. The work was published by Freeman Collins and sold by Richard Mount of London as the Great Britain's Coasting Pilot. Partially based on Dutch maps and replicating some of their errors, nevertheless the charts were an enormous advance and "entitle Collins to rank not only with the earliest, but with the best of English hydrographers."

References

Sources

External links
 

 

Royal Yachts of the Kingdom of England
1660s ships
Ships built in Rotherhithe